Tabon may refer to:

Places
Tabon Caves, a group of caves located in Palawan, Philippines
Tabon Island
Tabon Island (Chile)
Tabon Island (Philippines)

In science
Tabon, the native name of the Philippine megapode
Tabon Man, several hominid remains found in the Paleolithic Tabon Caves archaeological site of Palawan
Tabon-tabon, the Visayan name of the tree Atuna excelsa subsp. racemosa

Other uses
Tabon M. Estrella National High School, a public high school in Bislig, Surigao del Sur